Vasileios Tsolakidis (born 9 September 1979) is a Greek gymnast. He competed in the men's parallel bars event at the 2012 Summer Olympics.

References

1979 births
Living people
Greek male artistic gymnasts
Olympic gymnasts of Greece
Gymnasts at the 2012 Summer Olympics
Gymnasts from Thessaloniki
European champions in gymnastics
20th-century Greek people
21st-century Greek people